Dominik Becker (born 9 January 2000) is a German professional footballer who plays as a defender for 3. Liga club 1. FC Saarbrücken, on loan from Werder Bremen.

Club career
In 2013 Becker moved from TuS Koblenz to join 1. FC Köln. Becker signed for Werder Bremen II from 1. FC Köln in May 2019. He played 33 games for Werder II in the Regionalliga Nord before he joined 1. FC Saarbrücken on loan in 2022. Becker made his first professional appearance when he started on 28 February 2022 in the 3. Liga against Türkgücü München in a 5–1 victory for his side.

International career
Becker was a member of the Germany U17 national team squad at the 2017 FIFA U-17 World Cup.

References

External links
 
 

2000 births
Living people
Sportspeople from Koblenz
German footballers
3. Liga players
Regionalliga players
SV Werder Bremen players
SV Werder Bremen II players
1. FC Saarbrücken players
Footballers from Rhineland-Palatinate